Benjamin J. Kallos (born February 5, 1981) is an American attorney and politician who represented the 5th district of the New York City Council from 2014 to 2021, and now serves in the Executive Office of the President in the United States Digital Service. He is a Democrat. The district includes East Harlem, Midtown, Murray Hill, Roosevelt Island and the Upper East Side of Manhattan. Kallos is also a software developer who ran his office on Agile, and has office hours at green markets.

Early life and education
Kallos was born in Florida. He attended Rabbi Arthur Schneier Park East Day School. He then attended Bronx High School of Science, SUNY Albany as an undergraduate, and SUNY Buffalo School of Law.

Career
Kallos has served as a Manhattan Community Board 8 public member and statewide coordination committee chair for the New York Democratic Lawyers Council from 2005 to 2013. He was also chief of staff for New York State Assemblymember Jonathan Bing from 2007 to 2009, director of policy for then New York City Public Advocate Mark J. Green in 2009, and executive director of New Roosevelt from 2010 to 2013.

New York City Council
On September 10, 2013, Kallos won the Democratic primary for the 5th New York City Council District, receiving 46% of the vote to Micah Kellner's 39% and Ed Hartzog’s 15%. He won the general election on November 5, 2013 and assumed office on January 1, 2014. On November 5, 2017, Kallos won reelection to another term with 81% of the vote.

Kallos has been ranked one of the best lawmakers on the New York City Council, with City & State giving him fifth place in 2017 and seventh in 2020. He was named one of the most powerful politicians in New York City in 2018, 2019, and 2021.

He is well known as an advocate for student loans, affordable housing and government transparency, as well as for keeping "big money" out of government. In 2018, Commercial Observer named him as one of the "Officials Who Call the Shots on Real Estate." Kallos was endorsed by the editorial board of The New York Times, who praised his "fresh ideas", including proposals to forgive student loans, incentivize the construction of more affordable housing, reform congestion pricing and expand access to broadband service.

He chaired the Committee on Contracts and was a member of the committees on Education, Governmental Operations, Oversight and Investigations, and Women and Gender Equity.

In 2015, Kallos proposed legislation to allow low-income residents on the Upper East Side to automatically receive Supplemental Nutrition Assistance Program and other government social safety benefits. In 2016, Kallos worked with Intuit to release their Benefits Assist software as free and open-source software. Later that year, Kallos proposed legislation to get scaffolding down in a timely manner. He introduced a law in 2017 to lower the noise allowed from construction during the evenings and weekend.

In 2016, Kallos, who is an ERISA attorney, authored legislation with Public Advocate Letitia James and Mayor Bill de Blasio for the city to automatically enroll employees in individual retirement accounts at no cost to employers who did not offer a retirement plan themselves. The law passed in 2021 and was then extended statewide.

Campaign finance and ethics 
In 2014, Kallos refused $64,000 in additional income, and authored legislature to ban outside income and make the job of Council Member full-time. In 2016, Kallos wrote a law to make New York City's budget available online, which he worked with Mayor de Blasio to implement.

On March 22, 2018, Kallos authored the law that raised the cap on public funds received by participating candidates to establish a full public matching system that matches every small dollar donated by New York City residents at a rate of 8 to 1. The new public matching system worked to elect the first majority women City Council.

Land use 
In 2015, Kallos worked with ProPublica and a whistle blower on an investigation that found 50,000 affordable apartments that were not registered by landlords who were receiving tax breaks, and might have been charging tenants too much rent. Kallos authored legislation to force landlords receiving tax benefits for affordable housing to register every unit and allow anyone to apply for them online. The law passed in 2017, requiring most landlords in New York City to register their affordable housing. In 2020, as part of the legislation, the city began to add back hundreds of thousands of existing affordable apartments and launched an affordable housing portal, Housing Connect.

Kallos has advocated against the construction of new luxury tower developments in New York City. In 2015, Kallos organized a community initiative to fight a proposed 950-foot "supertower" that would expand the neighborhood known as Billionaire's Row. In 2016, Kallos joined a grass roots rezoning effort to prevent the construction of more supertowers to protect existing affordable housing. This rezoning effort successfully halted the construction of another luxury skyscraper in 2017. Kallos led a rezoning that banned the use of mechanical voids as a loophole for luxury housing developments to exceed height limitations by "give billionaires better views".

He opposed legislation that would weaken the city's landmarks law in 2015. In 2017, Kallos authored laws to reform a zoning relief board and force developers to honor commitments for promised public spaces. In 2019, Kallos opened supportive housing for homeless women and children in the Upper East Side. He advocated for opening a new safe haven shelter in his district in 2021.

Education 
Kallos wrote legislature to force transparency around how the city determines need for school seats. As a result of these laws, the city agreed to add hundreds of new school seats to the neighborhood Kallos represents. He began advocating for free pre-kindergarten for all four-year-olds in 2014. After this proposal won, he advocated for the addition of 400 new pre-kindergarten seats for his district in 2018, which had not been granted enough seats. Kallos advocated for extending free pre-kindergarten to all three-year-olds, which had a citywide rollout in 2021.

As a public student, Kallos was too ashamed to stand on the free and reduced school lunch line and went hungry instead. He authored a law to mandate reporting on the number of meals served to students to help extend breakfast after the bell and free lunch to every public school student in 2015. In 2021, Kallos proposed offering free supper at every public school to end youth hunger.

In 2015, Kallos joined Letitia James in advocating for cable companies to offer low-cost high-speed Internet to low-income New Yorkers, as a way of bridging the digital divide. In 2017, Kallos and James won low-cost high-speed Internet for one million students on free and reduced lunch as well as seniors on Supplemental Security Income. Kallos then proposed legislation to force landlords to offer basic internet as a utility.

Public health and climate change 
Kallos authored a law to create the Offices of Food Policy and Urban Agriculture. Kallos passed a law in 2019 to require that only healthy drinks are offered with children's meals in New York City.

In 2019, Kallos authored a declaration of climate emergency and passed it making New York City the largest city in the United States to do so. In 2018, Kallos introduced legislation to ban the sale of plastic water bottles in city parks and purchase by city agencies that Mayor de Blasio implemented by executive order in 2020.

He authored the law to ban toxic pesticides from being used in New York City parks in 2021.

Campaign for Manhattan Borough President
Kallos ran in the primary for the Democratic nomination in the 2021 Manhattan borough president election, finishing fourth. In the first round, Kallos received 13% of votes, putting him in third place. He was eliminated in the sixth round of the ranked-choice voting process.

Election history

References

External links
 Kallos for Council
 New York Democratic Lawyers Council
 OpenLegislation.org
 VoterSearch.org

1981 births
20th-century American Jews
American political activists
Candidates in the 2021 United States elections
Living people
New York City Council members
New York (state) Democrats
People from Manhattan
The Bronx High School of Science alumni
University at Albany, SUNY alumni
University at Buffalo Law School alumni
Activists from New York (state)
21st-century American politicians
21st-century American Jews